John William Gallon (12 February 1914 – 1993) was an English professional footballer who played as an inside forward.

Career
Born in Burradon, Gallon played for Burradon Colliery Welfare, Blyth Spartans, Bedlington United, Carlisle United, Bradford City, Bradford Park Avenue, Swansea Town, Gateshead, North Shields and Ashington. For Bradford City he made 20 appearances in the Football League; he also made one appearance in the FA Cup. During World War II he played as a guest for Port Vale, Hartlepool United, Manchester United, Rochdale, Stockport County, Walsall, Bolton Wanderers, Bradford City, Bristol City, Gateshead, and Burnley.

Career statistics
Source:

Sources

References

1914 births
1993 deaths
Footballers from Northumberland
English footballers
Association football inside forwards
Blyth Spartans A.F.C. players
Bedlington United A.F.C. players
Carlisle United F.C. players
Bradford City A.F.C. players
Bradford (Park Avenue) A.F.C. players
Swansea City A.F.C. players
Port Vale F.C. wartime guest players
Hartlepool United F.C. wartime guest players
Manchester United F.C. wartime guest players
Rochdale A.F.C. wartime guest players
Stockport County F.C. wartime guest players
Walsall F.C. wartime guest players
Bolton Wanderers F.C. wartime guest players
Bradford City A.F.C. wartime guest players
Bristol City F.C. wartime guest players
Gateshead A.F.C. players
Burnley F.C. wartime guest players
North Shields F.C. players
Ashington A.F.C. players
English Football League players